Bachelor Bait is a 1934 American comedy film about a man (William Watts) who is fired from his job issuing marriage licenses at city hall because of the actions of a co-worker.  He starts a match making business which becomes very successful because of Mr. Watts' ability to find suitable matches for everybody except for himself. Bachelor Bait (originally titled The Great American Harem) was director George Stevens' first feature-length film for RKO, filmed from 30 April to 18 May 1934.

Plot
Stu Erwin plays a kindhearted man who, after losing his job as a civil servant in a marriage license office, opens his own business, Romance Inc., which becomes a successful matrimonial agency. When he sets up his secretary (Rochelle Hudson) with a wealthy client (Grady Sutton), he realizes just in time that he is really in love with her.

Cast
 Stuart Erwin as Mr. William Watts
 Rochelle Hudson as Cynthia Douglas
 Pert Kelton as Allie Summers
 Richard "Skeets" Gallagher as Bramwell Van Dusan
 Berton Churchill as "Big" Barney Nolan
 Grady Sutton as Don Beldon/Diker
 Clarence Wilson as District Attorney Clement Craftsman
 Landers Stevens as Mr. Wells

Analysis 
According to Marilyn Ann Moss, Bachelor Bait "is a light comedy that touches briefly on the Depression (when mention is made of "everyone being out of work these days") before it supplies its audience with a leisurely paced series of misadventures."

The film lost $3,000 for RKO Studios.

References

External links
Bachelor Bait at IMDb

1934 romantic comedy films
1934 films
Films directed by George Stevens
1930s English-language films
American romantic comedy films